Jamalpur-Khadiya is one of the 182 Legislative Assembly constituencies of Gujarat state in India. It is part of Ahmedabad district and is a segment of Ahmedabad West Lok Sabha constituency.

List of segments

This assembly seat represents the following segments,

 Ahmedabad City Taluka (Part) – Ahmedabad
 Municipal Corporation (Part) Ward No. – 1, 5, 6, 39.

Members of Vidhan Sabha

Election results

2022

2017

2012

See also
 List of constituencies of the Gujarat Legislative Assembly
 Ahmedabad district

References

External links
 

Assembly constituencies of Gujarat
Ahmedabad district